A graceful exit (or graceful handling) is a simple programming idiom wherein a program detects a serious error condition and "exits gracefully" in a controlled manner as a result. Often the program prints a descriptive error message to a terminal or log as part of the graceful exit.

Usually, code for a graceful exit exists when the alternative — allowing the error to go undetected and unhandled — would produce spurious errors or later anomalous behavior that would be more difficult for the programmer to debug. The code associated with a graceful exit may also take additional steps, such as closing files, to ensure that the program leaves data in a consistent, recoverable state.

Graceful exits are not always desired. In many cases, an outright crash can give the software developer the opportunity to attach a debugger or collect important information, such as a core dump or stack trace, to diagnose the root cause of the error.

In a language that supports formal exception handling, a graceful exit may be the final step in the handling of an exception. In other languages graceful exits can be implemented with additional statements at the locations of possible errors.

The phrase "graceful exit" has also been generalized to refer to letting go from a job or relationship in life that has ended.

In Perl 
In the Perl programming language, graceful exits are generally implemented via the  operator. For example, the code for opening a file often reads like the following:

# Open the file 'myresults' for writing, or die with an appropriate error message.
open RESULTS, '>', 'myresults' or die "can't write to 'myresults' file: $!";

If the attempt to open the file myresults fails, the containing program will terminate with an error message and an exit status indicating abnormal termination.

In Java 
In the Java programming language, the  block is used often to catch exceptions.  All potentially dangerous code is placed inside the block and, if an exception occurred, is stopped, or caught.

try {
    // Try to read the file "file.txt"
    Scanner sc = new Scanner(new File("file.txt"));
    while (sc.hasNextLine())
        System.out.println(sc.readLine());
    sc.close();
} catch(IOException e) {
    // The file could not be read
    System.err.println("The file could not be read. Stack trace:");
    e.printStackTrace();
}

In C 
In C one can use the error(3) function, provided in GNU by the GNU C Library.

int fd;
if ((fd = open("/dev/urandom", O_RDONLY)) < 0) error(1, errno, "Open failed");

If the first parameter is non-zero this function will exit from the parent process and return that parameter.

See also 
 Graceful degradation
 Fail-safe

References 

Computer programming folklore
Control flow